Nee Kosam (English: For You)  is a 1999 Indian Telugu-language romantic drama film produced by Ghanta Srinivasa Rao under the Kalpana Creations banner. This movie marks the debut of Srinu Vaitla as a director. The film features Ravi Teja and Maheswari in the lead roles. This is also the first collaboration between Ravi Teja and Srinu Vaitla. The music has been composed R. P. Patnaik. Despite the film being a box office failure, the film won several Nandi Awards.

Plot
Sasirekha (Maheswari) is the daughter of a rich father (Jayaprakash Reddy), who is a strict disciplinarian and hates any kind of love affair. Ravi (Ravi Teja), an orphan, falls in love with Sasi and she also slowly develops feelings for Ravi. One day Ravi meets Sasi's father in the outskirts of the city and tells him all about his love. However, he is accidentally killed by Ravi in a scuffle. Sasi soon finds out that the real culprit is Ravi. Infuriated, she breaks up with him. Ravi, unable to bear the rejection, jumps from a hill. He escapes death, only to be told by the doctors that he is disabled and might be cured in the future if someone took care of him. In the climax, Sasi decides to stay with Ravi, who is nothing but a vegetable now, stating that what ever he did was just because of his love for her and she still is in love with him.

Cast

Box office
The movie was an average grosser at the box office, but went on to win 4 Nandi Awards.

Awards
Nandi Awards - 1999
 Second Best Feature Film - Silver - Ghanta Srinivas
 Best Actress - Maheswari
 Best Screenplay Writer - Sreenu Vaitla
 Best First Film of a Director - Sreenu Vaitla

Soundtrack
The soundtrack is composed by R. P. Patnaik. "Konte Baapu" song is composed by Devi Sri Prasad. The audio rights of the soundtrack were purchased by Supreme Music.

References

External links
 

1999 films
Films directed by Srinu Vaitla
1999 directorial debut films